Désiré Paternoster (born 21 January 1887, date of death unknown) was a Belgian footballer. He played in nine matches for the Belgium national football team from 1908 to 1911.

References

External links
 

1887 births
Year of death missing
Belgian footballers
Belgium international footballers
Place of birth missing
Association football forwards